Maternal embryonic leucine zipper kinase (MELK) is an enzyme that in humans is encoded by the MELK gene.  MELK is a serine/threonine kinase belonging to the family of AMPK/Snf1 protein kinases.  MELK was first identified present as maternal mRNA in mouse embryos.  MELK expression is elevated in a number of cancers and is an active research target for pharmacological inhibition.

MELK was previously believed to be essential for cancer cell proliferation. However, recent research using CRISPR has demonstrated that MELK is fully dispensable for cancer cell growth, casting doubt on the rationale for targeting this protein in patients. The results are dependent on the experimental design. Therefore, there is a need for further research.

Interactions 

MELK has been shown to interact with CDC25B.

References

Further reading 

 
 
 
 
 
 
 
 
 

EC 2.7.11